Nokia Lumia 610 is a Windows Phone smartphone announced at Mobile World Congress 2012. It is designed for young consumers that are buying their first smartphone. The Lumia 610 has a curvy, metallic design. Like the Lumia 710, it comes in cyan, magenta, black and white. The black and magenta version have a rubberized back instead of the glossy back as found in the white and cyan version of this phone.

Because of the limited memory available on this phone, background tasks using over 90 MB of RAM will be disabled automatically and certain applications will not be able to run. Applications whose user experience is not up to par with Nokia and the application (like Skype, Angry Birds or Pro Evolution Soccer) expectation, will not be available from the marketplace.

On 11 April 2012 Nokia introduced a variant with Near Field Communication (NFC), the first Lumia device with NFC technology. It was released in collaboration with operator Orange in Europe.

On 5 December 2012, the Nokia Lumia 620, the successor of the Nokia Lumia 610, was presented. The improvements are Windows Phone 8, dual-core 1 GHz Qualcomm S4 chipset, 512 MB of RAM, a front-facing VGA camera, a slightly bigger 3.8-inch display and support for up to 64 GB microSD cards.

Specifications

Hardware

The Lumia 610 has a 3.7-inch TFT capacitive display. It is powered by an 800 MHz Cortex-A5 Qualcomm Snapdragon S1 processor, 256 MB of RAM and 8 GB of internal storage. It has a 1300 mAh Li-Ion battery and a 5-megapixel rear camera. It is available in white, cyan, magenta and black.

Software
The Lumia 610 ships with Windows Phone 7.10

Reception
The GSMArena team wrote: "The truth is the Nokia Lumia 610 is currently slightly overpriced. We did say that it's all about what you get and not what you miss in this class but, as things currently stand, its competitors will give you more without extra charge. It sounds like common sense that the only way for an affordable WP smartphone to succeed is to be cheaper than its droid peers."

Jonathan Choo of FoneArena in his review wrote: "I feel that resources spent at making Windows Phone Tango a reality on 256MB RAM devices were wasted. I know I have used the word compromise a lot in this review, but that is what the Lumia 610 is. It’s a phone full of compromises. With Windows Phone Apollo nearing completion, I suspect this will be the first and only Tango device to be ever released by the Finnish brand, and for that alone, I just can’t possibly recommend this. If you are in the market for a budget Windows Phone device, get the Lumia 710 or HTC Radar, or check out one of the older first generation Windows Phone devices like the Omnia 7 and HTC 7 Trophy instead."

See also
 Windows Phone
 Nokia Lumia 710
 Nokia Lumia 800
 Nokia Lumia 900

References

Further reading

External links

  - 
 Lumia 610 technical specifications (at developer.nokia.com) -

Lumia 610
Microsoft Lumia
Windows Phone devices
Mobile phones introduced in 2012
Discontinued smartphones
Videotelephony
Mobile phones with user-replaceable battery